Rondeletia odorata is a species of flowering plant in the coffee family. It is native to Cuba and Panama. It is cultivated elsewhere. Common names include rondeletia, Cleveland Sunrise, and Panama-rose.

This plant is a shrub or small tree growing up to 2 meters tall. The rough, leathery leaves are oppositely arranged and measure up to 5 centimeters long. The inflorescence is a cluster of several five-lobed flowers in shades of bright red with yellow throats.

There are three subspecies, Rondeletia odorata subsp. bullata, R. o. subsp. grandifolia, and R. o. subsp. odorata.

References

odorata
Flora of Cuba
Flora of Panama
Taxa named by Nikolaus Joseph von Jacquin
Flora without expected TNC conservation status